Milan Kotrč (born 23 May 1988) is a Czech handball player for Minaur Baia Mare and the Czech national team. He previously played for Bergischer HC.

He participated at the 2018 European Men's Handball Championship.

References

1988 births
Living people
Sportspeople from Prague
Czech male handball players
Expatriate handball players
Handball-Bundesliga players
Czech expatriate sportspeople in Germany 
Czech expatriate sportspeople in Romania